Lomonosovsky District, Moscow  is an administrative district (raion) of South-Western Administrative Okrug, and one of the 125 raions of Moscow, Russia. Population: 85,000 (2017 est.).
Population - 81,851. Established at 1995.
Named after Mikhail Vasilyevich Lomonosov.

Education
The branch of the Moscow State Pedagogical University, The Moscow Finnish School, the Japanese School in Moscow, the Swedish School in Moscow, and the main campus of the Scuola Italiana Italo Calvino (Italian school) occupy a single campus in the district.

See also

Administrative divisions of Moscow

References

Notes

Sources

Districts of Moscow